The Answer Is...: Reflections on My Life is a 2020 memoir by Alex Trebek. The long-time Jeopardy! host recounts his life and relationships, as well as his work in television. Three and a half months after the book's release, Trebek died after a 20-month battle with stage IV pancreatic cancer.

The audiobook was narrated by Ken Jennings, who succeeded Trebek on November 30, 2020, for taping seven days (seven weeks) span. It was nominated for the Grammy Award for Best Spoken Word Album at the 63rd Grammy Awards, losing to Rachel Maddow's Blowout.

References

2020 non-fiction books
Canadian memoirs
American memoirs
Jeopardy!
Simon & Schuster books